The 1950 Nations Grand Prix was a motor race set to Formula One rules, held on 30 July 1950. The race was won by Argentinean driver Juan Manuel Fangio after a distance of 68 laps.

Classification

Qualifying

Race

References

Nations Grand Prix